Ceratinella is a genus of  dwarf spiders that was first described by James Henry Emerton in 1882.
They are very similar to both Ceraticelus and Idionella, and the taxonomy of these spiders may change.

Species
 it contains twenty-six species and one subspecies:
Ceratinella acerea Chamberlin & Ivie, 1933 – USA
Ceratinella alaskae Chamberlin & Ivie, 1947 – Russia (Middle Siberia, Far East), Canada, USA
Ceratinella apollonii Caporiacco, 1938 – Italy
Ceratinella brevipes (Westring, 1851) – Europe, Caucasus, Russia (Europe to South Siberia), Japan
Ceratinella brevis (Wider, 1834) (type) – Europe, Turkey, Caucasus, Russia (Europe to Far East), Central Asia, China, Korea, Japan
Ceratinella brunnea Emerton, 1882 – USA, Canada
Ceratinella buna Chamberlin, 1949 – USA
Ceratinella diversa Chamberlin, 1949 – USA
Ceratinella fumifera Saito, 1939 – Japan
Ceratinella hemetha Chamberlin, 1949 – USA
Ceratinella holocerea Chamberlin, 1949 – USA
Ceratinella kenaba Chamberlin, 1949 – USA
Ceratinella kurenshchikovi Marusik & Gnelitsa, 2009 – Russia (Far East)
Ceratinella major Kulczyński, 1894 – Europe
Ceratinella ornatula (Crosby & Bishop, 1925) – USA, Canada, Greenland
Ceratinella o. alaskana Chamberlin, 1949 – USA (Alaska)
Ceratinella parvula (Fox, 1891) – USA
Ceratinella plancyi (Simon, 1880) – China
Ceratinella playa Cokendolpher, Torrence, Smith & Dupérré, 2007 – USA
Ceratinella rosea Oliger, 1985 – Russia (Far East)
Ceratinella scabrosa (O. Pickard-Cambridge, 1871) – Europe, Caucasus, Russia (Europe to South Siberia)
Ceratinella sibirica Strand, 1903 – Russia (Middle Siberia)
Ceratinella subulata Bösenberg & Strand, 1906 – Japan
Ceratinella sydneyensis Wunderlich, 1976 – Australia (New South Wales)
Ceratinella tigana Chamberlin, 1949 – USA (Alaska)
Ceratinella tosior Chamberlin, 1949 – USA
Ceratinella wideri (Thorell, 1871) – Europe, Russia (Europe to Far East), Central Asia

See also
 List of Linyphiidae species

References

Araneomorphae genera
Fauna of the Arctic
Linyphiidae
Palearctic spiders
Spiders of Asia
Spiders of North America